Pierzchnica  is a town in Kielce County, Świętokrzyskie Voivodeship, in south-central Poland. It is the seat of the gmina (administrative district) of Gmina Pierzchnica. The village has a population of 870.

In the late Middle Ages, Pierzchnica was a royal village, first mentioned in documents from 1336. It is not known when it was granted a town charter – it happened between 1359 and 1397, during the reign of either Kazimierz Wielki or Wladyslaw Jagiello. The name of the town was spelled as either Pyrzsznycza or Pyersnicza (1579). According to Jan Długosz, the town remained a royal property, with its wooden church. In 1497, King Jan Olbracht allowed Pierzchnica to organize markets on every Tuesday. In 1512, the Magdeburg rights town charter for Pierzchnica was confirmed, after the original document had burned in a fire. Nevertheless, Pierzchnica remained a small and poor town, with 50 houses in 1621, much smaller than Szydlow. Furthermore, it was burned to the ground during the Swedish invasion of Poland (1656).

Until the Partitions of Poland, Pierzchnica remained in private hands, and was part of Sandomierz Voivodeship. In 1789, the town had a wooden town hall, with 70 houses (65 Catholic and 5 Jewish). In 1798–1800, while part of the Habsburg Empire, the former Voivode of Sandomierz Maciej Soltyk funded a new, stone church of St. Margaret, which replaced the wooden complex. In 1815, Pierzchnica became part of Russian-controlled Congress Poland. In 1827, it had 111 houses and the population of 641, which grew to almost 1,000 by 1862. Its residents actively supported the January Uprising, for which Pierzchnica was stripped of its town charter in 1869.

References

Pierzchnica
Kielce Governorate
Kielce Voivodeship (1919–1939)